Newton Burrowes (born 1955), is a male Jamaican born former weightlifter who competed for Great Britain and England.

Weightlifting career
Burrowes represented Great Britain in the 1980 Summer Olympics and the 1984 Summer Olympics.

He represented England and won a silver medal in the 75 kg middleweight division, at the 1978 Commonwealth Games in Edmonton, Alberta, Canada. Four years later he represented England and won a gold medal in the 82.5 kg light-heavyweight division, at the 1982 Commonwealth Games in Brisbane, Queensland, Australia.

References

1955 births
English male weightlifters
Commonwealth Games medallists in weightlifting
Commonwealth Games gold medallists for England
Commonwealth Games silver medallists for England
Weightlifters at the 1978 Commonwealth Games
Weightlifters at the 1982 Commonwealth Games
Weightlifters at the 1980 Summer Olympics
Weightlifters at the 1984 Summer Olympics
Olympic weightlifters of Great Britain
Living people
Medallists at the 1978 Commonwealth Games
Medallists at the 1982 Commonwealth Games